Rokytňany  is a municipality in Jičín District in the Hradec Králové Region of the Czech Republic. It has about 100 inhabitants.

Administrative parts
The municipality is made up of villages of Horní Rokytňany and Dolní Rokytňany.

References

Villages in Jičín District